The Order of Merit of Duarte, Sánchez and Mella (Orden al Mérito de Duarte, Sánchez y Mella) is the principal order of the Dominican Republic. It was established on 24 February 1931 as the Juan Pablo Duarte Order of Merit (Orden al Mérito Juan Pablo Duarte) and renamed on 9 September 1954. The Head of State confers the order both to civilians and military personnel for distinguished services.

Division of the Order
The order is divided in seven grades:

 Collar is awarded to the President of the Republic 
 Grand Cross with Gold Breast Star is awarded for foreign chiefs of state and to former presidents and vice presidents
 Grand Cross with Silver Breast Star is awarded to members of legislatures and supreme court, ministers of state, ambassadors and the metropolitan archbishop
 Grand Officer is awarded to service chiefs and high officials of government and church
 Commander is awarded to governors of provinces, directors general of instruction, directors of academies, dean of universities, authors and others of similar importance
 Officer is awarded to professors and heads of schools, officers of the rank of colonel and above and civilians of equal importance
 Knight is awarded to others

Accoutrements
The collar of the Order will be solid, of  platinum and gold, formed for various parts, compound each one of a laurel's coronet and of the Duarte, Sánchez and Mella's bust; in the center of the collar will have (in a big size and enameled in natural colors) the Coat of Arms of the Republic, which above will be adorned with twelve brilliant. Below, will suspended the order's badge. The laurel's coronet, the coat of arms and the badge will be adorned with precious stones.

References
 Law 1113 of the 
 Regulation No. 187 of the 16 February 1939 (G. O. 5277 18 February 1939

External links
Secretaría de Estado de Relaciones Exteriores (Law) (In Spanish)
Secretaría de Estado de Relaciones Exteriores (Reglament) (In Spanish)
Medals of the Dominican Republic
Order of Duarte, Sanchez and Mella

  

Orders, decorations, and medals of the Dominican Republic